The 1943 Oklahoma Sooners football team represented the University of Oklahoma in the 1943 college football season. In their third year under head coach Dewey Luster, the Sooners compiled a 7–2 record (5–0 against conference opponents), won the Big Six Conference championship, and outscored their opponents by a combined total of 187 to 92.

No Sooners received All-America honors in 1943, but six Sooners received all-conference honors: Bob Brumley (back), Gale Fulgham (guard), Lee Kennon (tackle), W.G. Lamb (end), Derald Lebow (back), and Bob Mayfield (center).

Schedule

Postseason

NFL Draft
The following players were drafted into the National Football League following the season.

References

Oklahoma
Oklahoma Sooners football seasons
Big Eight Conference football champion seasons
Oklahoma Sooners football